Johann Carl Ludwig Schmid (12 September 1780 in Cottbus – 4 September 1849 in Berlin) was a German architect. He succeeded August Günther as leader of the Oberbaudeputation in 1842, and in 1848 the kingdom of Prussia made him director of Berlin's Bauakademie.

1780 births
1849 deaths
People from Cottbus
People from the Margraviate of Brandenburg
18th-century German architects
19th-century German architects